Dyno may refer to:
DYNO, a BMX bike company started in 1982
Dyno (company), an emergency drainage and plumbing company
Dyno – short name for Dynamometer – a device for measuring force, torque or power
Dyno, an application container on the cloud platform Heroku

See also
Dino (disambiguation)
Deno (disambiguation)